Lisa is a Swedish-German-Hungarian animated preschool television series created by Magnus Carlsson. It was produced by Happy Life and is aimed at younger children.

Production and telecast

The Lisa series was first produced as a series of cinematically-released short films. The first short film, Lisa får en barnvakt, premiered in June 1996 and was released as a book the following year. Two further short films, Lisa hos tandläkaren and Lisa på picknick, were granted funding from the Swedish Film Institute in February 1997 and released in January 1998.

The series was aired on SVT beginning in 1999. It also aired on KIKA in Germany. In addition with English voices, it screened on Nick Jr. in the United Kingdom and HBO Family in the US, as well as distributed internationally by Fox Kids. There were also some books made based on the series. The series was narrated by Gösta Ekman.

Carlsson left Happy Life for a few years after having co-founded the studio, but Happy Life went on to produce more episodes of Lisa without Carlsson's involvement nor approval. Carlsson then sued his former employer for copyright infringement, a lawsuit he won in arbitration by January 2002.

Plot 
The series focuses on Lisa, a title little girl lead who also serves as the narrator. She lives with her parents in a two-story house. Sometimes, she visits his dad's place of work and they walk around town. She likes to play with her parents and neighbours. Various children have playmates and play in her yard.

Characters 
 Lisa is a little girl with curly, stringed hair and eyelashes.
 Mum and Dad are the parents of Lisa. She does the housework and often goes shopping with Lisa. He works at the other end of the city, but once vacationed on the Canary Islands, where he got very sunburnt.
 Aunt Wilson is Lisa's neighbour and aunt, she likes to play with Lisa.
 Uncle Wilson is Lisa's spectacled, half-bald, slim uncle, who lives in Lisa's flat next door.
 Holger is a big-eared boy and one of Lisa's friends.
 The Fat Aunt is Lisa's aunt, and she can only get into the elevator by turning to the side.

TV episodes

External links

References 

1990s German animated television series
1998 German television series debuts
1998 German television series endings
1990s animated comedy television series
1990s Swedish television series
1998 Swedish television series debuts
1998 Swedish television series endings
Swedish animated television series
Television series by Mattel Creations